Sasthamkotta, or Sasthamcotta, is a village in the Kunnathoor Tehsil of Kollam district in the state of Kerala, India. Kunnathoor taluk headquarters is located at Sasthamkotta. The Sasthamkotta freshwater lake is the largest freshwater lake in Kerala.

Location
It is the location of the Sasthamcotta Sree Dharma Sastha Temple.

Tourism
The place is naturally beautiful and is surrounded by hills and valleys. 
In the midst of the hills is the Fresh Water Lake. The extensive freshwater lake here is the biggest of its kind in Kerala. Water supply to the Kollam town is met by purifying the water from this lake.

Sasthamcotta Sree Dharmasastha Temple

The temple is dedicated to Sree Dharmasastha(Lord Ayyappa) and the surroundings of the temple are covered by hills and forests. One of the features of the Sasthamcotta temple is the abundance of monkeys that camp around, which are considered holy. It is believed that Lord Hanuman at the time flying to Lanka in search of Goddess Sita, halted at this place also, and since then this Temple is a home for Monkeys. The monkeys are devotee-friendly, and the thousands of devotees visiting the temple take pleasure in feeding these monkeys with nuts and fruits.

Culture
Many movies and TV serials shot at Sasthamcotta, like Inapravukal (1965), Ente Hridayathinte Udama (2002), Ilamurathampuran (1998), Nakshathrakkannulla Rajakumaran (2002), Kuttisrank (2009) etc. are some of those.
The Second World Religion Conference had been held in Sasthamcotta, in which the global religious leaders had particularly participated.

Demographics
 India census, Sasthamkotta had a population of 32,330 with 15,818 males and 16,512 females.

Transport 
Sasthamkotta is connected to all nearby cities and towns by road. Karunagappally, Adoor via NH-183A, Kottarakkara, chengannur, kayamkulam etc.,  KSRTC  operates venad chain bus service from Kollam-Pathanamthitta, Karunagappally-Kottarakkara, which are pass-through Sasthamkotta and chengannur-Kollam Pass through Bharanikkavu

Railways 
Sasthamkotta railway station (Code:STKT) falls under the Thiruvananthapuram railway division of the Southern Railway Zone of Indian Railways.[2][3][4] It is coming in between Munrothuruthu railway station and Karunagappalli railway station. The nearest important major rail head to Sasthamkotta is Kollam Junction railway station and Karunagappalli railway station

Notable Personalities from Sasthamcotta

K. R. Meera

M. D. Retnamma (Novelist & Short Story Writer)

Abdul Nasser Mahdani - founder of the Peoples Democratic Party (PDP)

P. Balachandran (Film Writer & Actor)

C.P. Rajasekharan Journalist& Writer

Ravi Saraswathi (Author & IT Executive)

Prof.C.Chandramathi (Short story Writer)

Dr.G.Sumithran ( Chief Cardio thoracic and Vascular Surgeon, Padmavathy Medical Foundation)

V.B unnithan (Journalist mathrubhumi)

References

External links

Appu's Sportings & Recreation Club Kovoor

Villages in Kollam district